Several ships of the Chilean Navy have been named Chacabuco after the Battle of Chacabuco:

  a corvette launched in 1815 as the Avon in the United States she was purchased by Chilean privateers in 1818 and renamed Coquimbo but was acquired by the Chilean government and renamed  Chacabuco. She was sold to Argentina in 1826.
  a corvette launched in 1866 and scrapped in 1890.
  a cruiser constructed as a private venture by her builders she was launched in 1898 under the name Fourth of July before being acquired by Chile in 1902 and renamed. She was struck in 1959.
  a cruiser launched in 1937 as USS Nashville she was acquired by Chile in 1951 and renamed Capitán Prat. In 1982 she was renamed Chacabuco and was scrapped in 1985
  a  commissioned in 1986

Chilean Navy ship names